The Pa'O Self-Administered Zone, also abbreviated as Pa'O SAZ, as stipulated by the 2008 Constitution of Myanmar, is a self-administered zone consisting of three townships in Shan State.

History 
Pa'O SAZ's official name was announced by decree on 20 August 2010.

In the wake of the 2021 Myanmar coup d'état and ensuing civil war, Pa'O youths, like many throughout the country, formed and joined resistance forces like the Pa-O National Defence Force, in opposition to military rule. 

On 24 February 2023, fighting began in Pinlaung Township, forcing more than 5,000 villagers to flee, including most villagers from Namneng. On 11 March 2023, the village of Namneng became the site of the Pinlaung massacre, during which Myanmar Army troops killed at least 30 civilians, including 3 Buddhist monks.

Government and politics

The zone is currently under the de facto control of the Pa-O National Organisation.

Administrative divisions

The Zone is divided into three townships:

The three townships are administratively part of Taunggyi District.

References

Self-administered zones of Myanmar
Subdivisions of Myanmar